The four big families of the Republic of China are four politically influential families in the Republic of China, first in Mainland China, then  Taiwan. They were responsible for much of China's management of finance, politics, economy, and law. The four big families begin with the Chinese surnames Chiang, Soong, Kung, and Chen.

The concept was believed to be coined by Chen Boda, a political figure and political theorist of the People's Republic of China.

Families
The following families and their descendants are listed below. Each indentation is at least one generation down, but not necessarily the next generation. Not all the descendants are shown.

Chiang family notables

 Chiang Kai-shek (蔣中正, 1887–1975), first President of the Republic of China
 Chiang Ching-kuo (蔣經國, 1910–1988), President of the Republic of China, son of Chiang Kai-shek
 Eddie Chiang (蔣孝勇, 1948–1996), politician
 Winston Chang (章孝慈, 1941–1996), Soochow University president
 John Chiang (蔣孝嚴, 1941–), politician

Soong family notables

 Charlie Soong (宋嘉樹, 1863–1918), businessman, friend of Sun Yat-Sen
 T. V. Soong (宋子文, 1891–1971), businessman
 Soong sisters
 Soong Ai-ling (宋藹齡, 1890–1973), married to H. H. Kung
 Soong Ching-ling (宋慶齡, 1893–1981), married to Sun Yat-sen, Honorary President of the People's Republic of China (1981), acting President of the People's Republic of China (1968–1972), acting Chairperson of the National People's Congress (1976–1978), Vice President of the People's Republic of China
 Soong Mei-ling (宋美齡, 1898–2003), married to Chiang Kai-shek, First Lady of the Republic of China
 Soong Zi-on (宋子安, 1906–1969), Guangzhou bank chairman

Kung family notables

 H. H. Kung (孔祥熙, 1881–1967), businessman, politician

Chen family notables

 Chen Qimei (陳其美, 1878–1916), politician
 Chen Guofu (陳果夫, 1892–1951), politician
 Chen Lifu (陳立夫, 1900–2001), politician

See also
 Four big families of Hong Kong

References

Republic of China
Political families of China